Imelda is a feminine Spanish/Italian given name derived from the German form of Irmhild. Notable people with the name include: 
 Imelda Calixto-Rubiano, Filipina politician
 Imelda Chiappa, Italian road racing cyclist
 Imelda Concepcion, Filipina actress
 Imelda Crawford, birth name of Anne Crawford, British actress
 Imelda Fransisca, Indonesian beauty queen
 Imelda Gruber, Italian luger
 Imelda Henry, Irish politician
 Imelda Hobbins, Irish camogie player
 Imelda Kennedy, Irish camogie player
 Imelda Lambertini, 14th-century Italy Dominican child saint
 Imelda Marcos, wife of Ferdinand Marcos and 10th First Lady of the Philippines
 Imelda Martínez, Mexican swimmer
 Imelda May, Irish singer
 Imelda Molokomme, feminist activist from Botswana
 Imelda Papin, Filipina singer
 Imelda Mary Read, known as Mel Read, British politician
 Imelda Roche, Australian businessperson
 Imelda Staunton, British actress
 Imelda Therinne, Indonesian actress
 Imelda Wiguno, Indonesian badminton player

Fictional characters 
 Imelda de' Lambertazzi, main character in the tragic opera of that name
 Imelda Quirke, backing singer in Roddy Doyle's The Commitments and later in The Guts
 Imelda Rivera, major character from the Disney movie: Coco (2017 film)

Others 
 Imelda, Tubajon, barangay in the Philippines

References 

Irish feminine given names
English feminine given names
Filipino feminine given names
Italian feminine given names
Spanish feminine given names